"How We Roll" is the only single by late American rapper Big Pun from the album Endangered Species, which features then-R&B newcomer Ashanti on the chorus & outro.
The video to the song was made into a cartoon and helped remember Big Pun throughout. The song peaked at number 53 on the Hot R&B/Hip-Hop Singles & Tracks and at number 16 on the Hot Rap Singles.

Track listing
"How We Roll" (Radio Version)
"How We Roll" (Squeaky Clean)
"How We Roll" (Album Version)
"How We Roll" (Instrumental)

References

External links
 How We Roll at Discogs

2001 singles
Big Pun songs
Ashanti (singer) songs
Songs written by Irv Gotti
2001 songs
Loud Records singles
Songs written by Big Pun